Frédéric Idesbald Van Goitsenhoven-Maeterlinck (born 11 August 1968 in Brussels) is a Belgian former singer and actor, best known for his participation in the 1995 Eurovision Song Contest.

Early life
Etherlinck was born in Brussels but soon after his birth his family emigrated to Los Angeles, where they lived until 1977. They then lived in Nice, France, for three years before returning to Brussels. Etherlinck later became a singer and drummer, performing in bars and cabarets in the Brussels area.

Eurovision Song Contest
In 1995, Etherlinck took part in the Belgian Eurovision Song Contest selection with the song "La voix est libre" ("The Voice is Free"). In the most evenly balanced selection in Belgium's Eurovision history, with only 13 points separating the top six songs, he emerged the narrow victor and went on to represent Belgium in the 40th Eurovision Song Contest, held on 13 May in Dublin. "La voix est libre" did not prove successful in the contest, ending the evening in 20th place out of 23 entries.

Later career
"La voix est libre" reached No. 21 on the Wallonian singles chart, but further success proved elusive. Etherlinck released an album entitled Les années lumières (Light Years) which failed to sell.  Today he is an actor and lives in Montreal.

References

External links
 

Belgian male singers
Belgian emigrants to Canada
Male actors from Brussels
Eurovision Song Contest entrants for Belgium
Eurovision Song Contest entrants of 1995
Musicians from Brussels
1968 births
Living people